The Delivery Man is an album by Elvis Costello.

(The) Delivery Man may also refer to:
 Delivery man, someone engaged in commercial delivery service
 Delivery Man (film), a 2013 American film
 The Delivery Man (TV series), a British television sitcom
 Delivery Man (Kirby), a character in the Kirby franchise
 The Delivery Man (novel), a novel by Joe McGinniss, Jr.
 MLB Delivery Man of the Year Award, a professional baseball award
 Delivery Man (TV series), a 2023 South Korean television